Ethmia phoenicura is a moth in the family Depressariidae. It is found in Baja California.

The ground color of the forewings is shining white with blackish brown markings, reflecting greenish blue. The ground color of the hindwings is brown, but the anal area is paler. Adults are on wing from late August to early January.

References

Moths described in 1932
[[Category:Ethmia]|phoenicura]